Johann Casimir Benicken (1 August 1782 – 1 December 1838) was a German jurist and judge from Schleswig-Holstein who also took an interest in the birds and natural history of the region. He was also a city secretary for Schleswig.

Benicken was born in Schleswig, son of high court councillor Johann Hinrich Oswald (1746–1787) and Helene Christina née Clausen (a great aunt of the poet Thedor Storm). He was educated at the Cathedral School in Schleswig and then at the Christian-Albrechts-Universität at Kiel from 1799. He continued studies at the University of Göttingen and passed the legal exam in 1803 at Gottorf. He became a lower court lawyer in Schleswig and from 1808 to 1837 he was city secretary. In 1825 he became judge for the estates of Buckhagen, Roest, Karlsburg and Windeby.

Benicken took an interest in birds and published on the gulls in 1812. He became a specialist on the gulls and documented ivory gulls in the Schleswig region. He collected specimens and corresponded with Frederik Faber, J.F. Mecklenburg, Friedrich Boie, Heinrich Boie, Johann Philipp Achilles Leisler and Christian Ludwig Brehm. His friends included Bernhard Christian Schleep and they received collections from Greenland and Iceland including a specimen of the great auk from Disko Island (the specimen is now in Copenhagen). His collection was partly donated to the University of Kiel and some were bought by Emil Hage.

Benicken was married twice, first to Friedericke Henriette Meckelburg and then to Elsabe Eleonore née Müller with a daughter from his second marriage.

References

External links 
 A note on the painting of the seagull hunt from the Schleswig Museum (in German)

1838 deaths
1782 births
German judges
People from Schleswig, Schleswig-Holstein
German ornithologists
Natural history collectors